Regina Pacis School (RP or Recis) is the name of three Catholic basic education institutions in Indonesia. These schools are located in Jakarta, Bogor and  Surakarta, and are named Regina Pacis Jakarta, Regina Pacis Bogor and Regina Pacis Surakarta. The name "Regina Pacis" is Latin which means Queen of Peace, referring to the Blessed Virgin Mary. The educational levels include kindergarten, primary school (grades 1–6), junior high school (grades 7–9), and senior high school (grades 10–12). Regina Pacis School is managed by the Regina Pacis Foundation under the Franciscan Missionaries of Mary (FMM) Congregation. Its motto is Ad Veritatem Per Caritatem meaning "Seeking Truth Through Charity".

Regina Pacis Jakarta 

Regina Pacis Jakarta is located in Jl. Palmerah Utara No.1, West Jakarta, Jakarta

Regina Pacis Bogor 
Regina Pacis Bogor was founded in July 1955 and is managed by the Regina Pacis FMM Foundation.

The school faces the Bogor Presidential Palace and Bogor Botanical Gardens. The school is located near most governmental and historical buildings of Bogor such as the court, the town hall, and the cathedral.

History 
Construction of the school began on 1 August 1948 by Sr. Goede Herder, FMM, and gave education from kindergarten to JHS. In 1955, Regina Pacis Bogor opened a senior high school program. At that time, the JHS and SHS only received the girls until July 1957 (for JHS) and 1962 (for SHS).

Facilities and teaching 

Regina Pacis Bogor school facilities include classrooms, two libraries, Physics Laboratory (JHS and SHS), Chemistry Laboratory (SHS), Biology Laboratory (JHS and SHS), Electrical Laboratory (SHS), and Computer laboratory (Elementary, JHS, and SHS). The school also has a hall, audiovisual room, basketball field, art room, and cafeteria.

Regina Pacis Surakarta 

Regina Pacis Surakarta is located in Jl. Adi Sucipto No. 45, Surakarta, Jawa Tengah, Indonesia.

References
  Alumnus site
  Regina Pacis Jakarta website
  Regina Pacis Bogor website
(in Indonesian) Regina Pacis Surakarta website
(in Indonesian) Regina Pacis Surakarta Wikipedia page

Catholic schools in Indonesia
1948 establishments in Indonesia
Schools in Jakarta
Bogor
Education in West Java